The Spiritual Telegraph was a New York City newspaper published from 1852–1860.

The Telegraph originated in the New York Conference for the Investigation of Spiritual Phenomena and reported that body's proceedings each week in the almost eight years that the journal was published. It is the first truly spiritualistic journal published in the United States, though the Univercoelum and the Spiritual Philosopher and others of more general nature antedate it. Though mild by even contemporary standards, the journal's "original goal of reporting spirit communication and furthering anti-credal reform" finally "aroused the emnity of all," as the journal admitted in changing its editorial line in 1858 and taking up the new name of Spiritual Telegraph and Fireside Preacher."

References

External links 
 Issues online in PDF

Publications established in 1852
Publications disestablished in 1860
Defunct newspapers published in New York City
1852 establishments in New York (state)